W Hotels is an American upscale lifestyle hotel chain owned by Marriott International that is marketed towards a younger age group.

History

W Hotels was launched in 1998 with W New York, a conversion of the former Doral Inn hotel on Lexington Avenue, Manhattan. It quickly became popular as a New York City nightclub. Identifying a gap in the market, Barry Sternlicht, CEO of Starwood Hotels 1995–2005, created the brand that popularized the lifestyle hotel concept of focusing on fashion and design. This included dark, muted colors, brushed metal, hotel staff in black T-shirts rather than white jackets, tasteful photographs, and a trendy bar. His demand for all-white bedding required manufacturers to develop white fabric that stayed clean without weekly dry cleaning.

The earlier Ws in the U.S. were cutting edge renovations of existing hotels within the Starwood group. Replacing the lobby with the "living room" concept, where guests could gather at the bar, differed from the traditional hotel. Although W receives credit for the idea, the underlying concept was once common. In the 1800s, the lobby provided a social gathering point in most communities. In earlier eras, the bar was often unseparated from the lobby. However, the aspirational, stylish, modern, and very strong design identity was W's unique feature. In 2001, Starwood added W New York - Times Square, a design model for the rapid expansion of properties in the United States over the next decade.

In following new trends, the challenge was to find the right balance between style, newness, attitude and profitability. Guests sought more than the cookie-cutter styles that had previously defined luxury and branded properties. The edgy W brand evolved with consumers. The demographics of early guests steered the W's rise into the luxury hotel tier.  It incorporated popular culture, contemporary design, and a certain casual irreverent attitude.

Each new W is unique, but all incorporate an entrance floor that holds all the public spaces, including the lobby, or "living room", a bar, restaurant and indoor and outdoor "hubs". However, the brand, positioned for the American environment, slowly aged. With global expansion, the aesthetic needed to evolve to resonate with those markets.  Consequently, each venue incorporated local cultural and design features.

W opened its first hotel in Europe in Istanbul in May 2008. Within the renovated Akaretler Row Houses, a group of historic structures built in the 1870s to house the employees of the Dolmabahçe Palace, the hotel blends the traditional Ottoman design of the row houses with the contemporary feel of a luxury brand. Opened in October 2009, W Barcelona hotel was W's first in Western Europe. The 26-story futuristic design by architect Ricardo Bofill, in the shape of a sail, is visible from throughout the city. A unique location is Punta de Mita, Mexico, where the W, which embraces a surfing culture, was built along the beach and into the natural forest of the nearby hillside. A notable project under development is the 62-story W Mumbai, also known as Namaste Tower.

Many properties are co-located with luxury apartments known as "Residences at the W", such as W Boston and W Austin. These residences are also marketed toward a younger, more affluent demographic.

In September 2016, Marriott gained the W chain as part of its acquisition of Starwood.

A risk of seeking to capture the moment is that the moment will inevitably pass. Consumer expectations have evolved beyond the earlier North American W designs. In recent years, guest satisfaction scores have fallen at North America locations. The W brand is no longer the pioneer of lifestyle hotels, but is now considered dated by today's young luxury lifestyle consumers. Consequently, W is modernizing. The Bliss products, once exclusively used for all bathroom amenities, are gone. The W Union Square, under renovation and scheduled for a 2022 reopening, will include a health food café, a destination bar and restaurant, a rooftop bar, a signature spa, and a large gym. This location will showcase the next design direction.

Gallery

References

External links

 
 

 
Hotels established in 1998
Marriott International brands
Luxury brands